Dandi Ram Dutta an Indian National Congress politician from Assam. He has been elected in Assam Legislative Assembly election in 1957–62 from Mangaldoi constituency and in 1962–67 from Kalaigaon (Vidhan Sabha constituency). Dutta was the Deputy Minister  of Bimala Prasad Chaliha's Ministry, the then Chief Minister of Assam .

References 

Year of birth missing
Possibly living people
Indian National Congress politicians from Assam
Assam MLAs 1957–1962
Assam MLAs 1962–1967